The Impact X Division Championship is a professional wrestling championship owned by the Impact Wrestling (formerly Total Nonstop Action Wrestling (TNA)) professional wrestling promotion. The title was created and debuted on June 19, 2002, at the taping of TNA's second weekly pay-per-view (PPV) event.

Title reigns are determined either by professional wrestling matches between wrestlers involved in pre-existing scripted feuds and storylines, or by scripted circumstances. Wrestlers are portrayed as either villains or heroes as they follow a series of tension-building events, which culminate in a wrestling match or series of matches for the championship. Title changes that happen on episodes of TNA's primary television program, TNA Impact!, air on television two to nine days from the date the match was taped. Changes that happened on weekly PPV events aired either during a live broadcast or aired on taped delay up to seven days apart. The inaugural champion was A.J. Styles, who defeated Low Ki, Jerry Lynn, and Psicosis in a Four Way Double Elimination match on June 19, 2002 at the taping of TNA's second weekly PPV event, which aired on June 26, 2002. Chris Sabin currently holds the record for the most reigns, with eight. At 301 days, Austin Aries' first reign is the longest in the title's history. At less than one day, Eric Young's only reign, Rockstar Spud's second reign, and Sabin's sixth reign are the shortest in the title's history. Overall, there have been 101 reigns shared among 50 wrestlers, with 13 vacancies.

Title history

Names

Reigns

Combined reigns

Footnotes
1: – Low Ki used the ring name Senshi in 2006 after his return to TNA.
3: – Each reign is ranked highest to lowest; reigns with the exact number mean that they are tied for that certain rank.

References
General

Specific

External links
Impact X Division Championship

Impact Wrestling champions lists